Eurya japonica, known as East Asian eurya, is a 1–3.5 m tall shrub in the Pentaphylacaceae family found in eastern China, Korea, and Japan. It is used as an ornamental plant.
In shinto it is a sacred tree, whose leaves are used as sacrificial offerings.

References

External links
 
 UBC Botanical Garden and Centre for Plant Research: Eurya japonica
 Images :Flavon's Wild herb and Alpine plants

japonica
Flora of China
Flora of Japan
Flora of Korea
Plants described in 1783